The Al-Sahlah Mosque is one of the primary significant mosques in the city of Kufa, Iraq. The mosque is of great importance to Shia Muslims, and it is believed that the mosque was initially established in Kufa as a neighborhood mosque for the followers of Ali, the early members of the Shia. The mosque is also said to be the future home of the Twelfth Shia Imam, Hujjat-Allah al-Mahdi.

History and design
Ongoing construction to the mosque lead to the completion of a new Sahn, named "The Sahn of Sayyidah Nargis", which was opened to the public in July 2013.

Significance
This mosque is revered for the following reasons from narrations according to Twelver Shia belief:
 This mosque is where the twelfth Imam, Hujjat-Allah al-Mahdi, will reside upon his return.
 This mosque served as a home for the Prophets and figures in Islam: Ibrahim (Abraham), Idris (Enoch), and Khidr.
 Every Prophet is said to have established prayers within this mosque.
 Establishing two Rakats of Islamic Prayer in this mosque can grant a person safety and protection for an entire year.
 The trumpet announcing the Day of Judgement will be blown from this mosque.
 Seventy thousand people will be resurrected here according to narrations, and enter Heaven without questioning.
 The first Shia Imam, Ali ibn Abi Talib has also stated that, "No anguished person goes to this mosque, prays in it, and supplicates to God, without God relieving him of his grief and granting him his request."

Gallery

See also

Holiest sites in Islam (Shia)

References

Shia mosques in Iraq
Kufa